Felix Bacher (born 25 October 2000) is an Austrian professional footballer who plays as a centre-back for Austrian Bundesliga club WSG Tirol.

References

External links
Felix Bacher at ÖFB

2000 births
Living people
Austrian footballers
Austria youth international footballers
Association football defenders
FC Wacker Innsbruck (2002) players
SC Freiburg II players
WSG Tirol players
2. Liga (Austria) players
Regionalliga players
Austrian Football Bundesliga players
Austrian expatriate footballers
Expatriate footballers in Germany
People from Lienz
Footballers from Tyrol (state)
Austrian expatriate sportspeople in Germany